The Catania Elephants are a professional American football team in Catania, Italy. They played in the Italian Football League from 2008 to 2012. The Elephants reached the IFL Super Bowl Championship game in 2010 and 2012, but lost to the Parma Panthers both times. The Elephants failed to apply for the 2013 IFL season due to money issues, so the team started the 2013 season in LeNAF (II Division), another nationwide football league with no imports (only Italian Players).

References

External links
Official website - IFL official website
Elephants official website - Catania Elephants official Website

American football teams in Italy
Catania
1984 establishments in Italy
American football teams established in 1984